Twogether is a South Korean-Taiwanese travel documentary streaming television series starring Lee Seung-gi and Jasper Liu. It was released by Netflix on June 26, 2020.

Synopsis
Actors Lee Seung-gi and Jasper Liu travel to six Asian cities (Yogyakarta and Bali in Indonesia, Bangkok and Chiang Mai in Thailand, Pokhara and Kathmandu in Nepal) where they must complete missions together, even though they do not speak each other's language, in order to meet their fans who recommended the locations they visited.

Cast
 Lee Seung-gi
 Jasper Liu

Episodes

Production

Development
On June 24, 2019, South Korean news media Osen reported that Lee Seung-gi and Jasper Liu would film a variety show where they would travel around the world together to meet their fans. Lee Seung-gi’s agency confirmed that the two actors were planning on starring in the show but denied that Netflix would release the program, which the streaming platform also denied. On September 9, 2019, a week after filming began, Netflix announced through a press release that Twogether would be available for streaming exclusively on its platform.

The show is produced by Company SangSang which is also behind the production of Netflix's game show Busted!.

Filming
Filming began on September 2, 2019 in Indonesia and ended in the fall in Seoul.

Release
On June 8, 2020, the main poster for the show was released along with the announcement that Twogether would premiere on June 26. The first trailer was released on June 11, the second one was released on June 23.

Critical reception
Joel Keller of Decider said that "Twogether is a pleasant diversion that has great scenery and two ingratiating young stars. Whether you read the subtitles or not, you’ll wish you were on the adventures Jasper and Seung-gi are on."

References

External links
 
 

2020s documentary television series
2020s travel television series
2020 South Korean television series debuts
2020 South Korean television series endings
Cultural tourism
Netflix original documentary television series
South Korean variety television shows
South Korean travel television series
Korean-language Netflix original programming
Mandarin-language Netflix original programming
Television shows set in Indonesia
Television shows set in Thailand
Television shows set in Nepal